Dead Lake  is a 2019 Russian TV series. It is a production of TV3 Russia, and Mediaslovo. The show won a prize during Accolade Global Film Competition in United States, and also won local prizes in Russia, during a film festival in Omsk.

The series' plot considered as Slavic Noir story with the classic crime plot been mixed with unique mystical flavor of Northern Russia along with its folklore.

Plot
Maksim Pokrovskiy is an experienced police officer from Moscow Police, who was sent to Northern Russia to investigate the murder of the local Oligarch's daughter.

Cast
 Yevgeny Tsyganov as Maksim Pokrovskiy
 Andrey Smolyakov as  Oligarch
 Nadezhda Mikhalkova as Natasha
 Pavel Tabakov as Pavel Skvortsov
 Lev Prygunov as Sandibalov
 Aleksandr Robak as Mikhail  Ganich
 Aleksandra Rebenok as Alina
 Timofey Tribuntsev as Yonko
 Polina Kutepova as Zinaida Petrovna
 Ksenia Kutepova as Tatyana Petrovna
 Kirill Polukhin as Smertin

Production
Filming of the TV series took place in 2017, in   Kirovsk, Murmansk Oblast, at the foot of the Khibiny Mountains and on the shore of lake Big Vudyavr.

References

External links
 
 Dead Lake at the KinoPoisk

Russian drama television series
2010s Russian television series
Russian police procedural television series
2018 Russian television series debuts
2019 Russian television series endings